This is a chronological list of cricketers who were murdered. These cricketers played in first-class cricket, List A, or at a similar level. This list does not include those who were killed in wars. They are listed separately at List of cricketers who were killed during military service.

Possibly murdered

References

Lists of cricketers
Lists of victims of crimes